Prince Georg Ludwig of Holstein-Gottorp (16 March 1719 – 7 September 1763) was a Prussian lieutenant-general and an Imperial Russian field marshal.

He was the youngest son of Christian August of Holstein-Gottorp, Prince of Eutin and his wife Albertina Frederica of Baden-Durlach. He joined the Prussian army in 1741 and was appointed major general in 1744. In the Seven Years' War, he served under the command of Field Marshal Johann von Lehwaldt where he was promoted to lieutenant-general. In 1760 he fought in the Battle of Torgau after which he was dismissed by Frederick the Great for not being fast enough. He then served for Peter III of Russia, his second cousin once removed, and became field marshal on 21 February 1762. Due to the revolution on 4 June 1762, headed by his niece, Catherine the Great, he lost his position and returned to Kiel where he died soon after.

Family

Georg Ludwig married Princess Sophie Charlotte of Schleswig-Holstein-Sonderburg-Beck (1722-1763) in 1750. She was the daughter of Frederick William II, Duke of Schleswig-Holstein-Sonderburg-Beck. They had three children:
 Friedrich (1751-1752), died in infancy;
 Wilhelm (1753-1772), died young, unmarried;
 Peter (1755-1829), who served as regent for his cousin before ultimately becoming Grand Duke of Oldenburg.

Sophie died on 7 August 1763, exactly one month before her husband.

References 

1719 births
1763 deaths
Field marshals of Russia
Prussian Army personnel
House of Holstein-Gottorp
18th-century military personnel from the Russian Empire
18th-century Prussian people